The Communauté de communes de Parthenay-Gâtine is the communauté de communes, an intercommunal structure, centred on the town of Parthenay. It is located in the Deux-Sèvres department, in the Nouvelle-Aquitaine region, western France. It was created in January 2014 by the merger of the former Communauté de communes de Parthenay with 3 other former communautés de communes. Its seat is Parthenay. Its area is 836.2 km2, and its population was 37,381 in 2018, of which 10,235 in Parthenay proper. It provides a framework within which local tasks common to the member communes can be carried out together. Amongst its other responsibilities, the communauté de communes organises the Festival Ludique International de Parthenay, a major games festival held in Parthenay every July.

The former communauté de communes de Parthenay was established in 2001 by six communes in the Parthenay area. In 2010, the commune of Fénery joined the community.

Communes
The communauté de communes consists of the following 38 communes:

Adilly
Allonne
Amailloux
Aubigny
Azay-sur-Thouet
La Chapelle-Bertrand
Les Châteliers
Châtillon-sur-Thouet
Doux
Fénery
La Ferrière-en-Parthenay
Fomperron
Les Forges
Gourgé
Lageon
Lhoumois
Ménigoute
Oroux
Parthenay
La Peyratte
Pompaire
Pougne-Hérisson
Pressigny
Reffannes
Le Retail
Saint-Aubin-le-Cloud
Saint-Germain-de-Longue-Chaume
Saint-Germier
Saint-Martin-du-Fouilloux
Saurais
Secondigny
Le Tallud
Thénezay
Vasles
Vausseroux
Vautebis
Vernoux-en-Gâtine
Viennay

References

External links
 Web site of the communauté de communes (in French)

Parthenay-Gatine
Parthenay-Gatine